Route nationale 12a (RN 12a) is a primary highway in Madagascar of 232 km, running from Vangaindrano to Tôlanaro (Fort Dauphin). It crosses the regions of Anosy and Atsimo-Atsinanana.
10 ferries have to be taken along this road.

Renovation
The part between Tolagnaro (Fort Dauphin) and Ebakika  Atsimo (45km) is presently being refurnished.

Selected locations on route
(north to south)

Vangaindrano
Masianaka - 30 km - ferry
Befasy, Anosy
Manambondro - 9th ferry over Mamandro river (186 km from Fort-Dauphin)
Manantenina - ferry over Soavary river; (107 km from Fort-Dauphin)
Esama - (ferry over Esama river)
Manambato, Ansoy
Ebakika  Atsimo
Mahatalaky 
Mandromodromotra (17 km before Fort Dauphin)
Tôlanaro (Fort Dauphin)

Ferries
10 rivers are crossed by this national road by ferry:
  Ferry No.  River   km 
Ferry n°1 Ebakika - PK 45
Ferry n°2 Vatomirindry  -PK 54
Ferry n°3 Iaboakoho - PK 60
Ferry n°4 Manambato - PK 75
Ferry n°5 Esama - PK 95
Ferry n°6 Manampanihy - PK 108
Ferry n°7 Maroroy - PK 124
Ferry n°8 Manara - PK 150
Ferry n°9 Manambondro - PK 189
Ferry n°10 Lower Masianaka - PK 216

See also
List of roads in Madagascar
Transport in Madagascar

References

Roads in Atsimo-Atsinanana
Roads in Anosy
Roads in Madagascar